FV-100, also known as Cf1743, is an orally available nucleoside analogue drug with antiviral activity. It may be effective against shingles.

It was discovered in 1999 in the laboratories of Prof Chris McGuigan, Welsh School of Pharmacy and Prof. Jan Balzarini, Rega Institute, Leuven, Belgium.

Clinical trials
FV-100 was tested  against valaciclovir in a phase II trial in patients with herpes zoster.  The trial was sponsored by Bristol-Myers Squibb.  The drug is currently being developed by ContraVir Pharmaceuticals, Inc., Edison, New Jersey. It has reached Phase III clinical trials.

References

Anti-herpes virus drugs
Nucleosides
Antiviral drugs
Furopyrimidines
Tetrahydrofurans